Shirin Yazdanbakhsh (Born in Isfahan) is an actress from Iran. She has won Crystal Simorgh Award for the Best supporting actress from 28th Fajr International Film Festival for her role in Please Do Not Disturb (2010). also she nominated for Crystal Simorgh Award for the Best supporting actress from 34th Fajr International Film Festival for her role in Life and a Day (2016).

Filmography 
 Killer Spider (2020)
Gholamreza Takhti (2019)
Los Angeles Tehran (2017-2018)
Boarding Pass (2017)
 Sara and Ayda (2017)
 Abji (2017)
 Yek rouz bekhosos (2017)
 Aaaadat Nemikonim (2016)
Life and a Day (Abad va yek rooz) (2016)
 Inversion (2016)
 Avalanche (2015)
 Closer (2015)
 Melbourne (2014)
 Barf (2014)
 Esterdad (2013)
 Ashghal haye Doost Dashtani (2012)
 Kissing the Moon-Like Face (2012)
 A Separation (2011)
 The Snow on the Pines (2010)
 Please Do Not Disturb'' (2010)

Awards and honors

References

External links 

 
 

Living people
1949 births
Actors from Isfahan
People from Tehran
Iranian film actresses
Crystal Simorgh for Best Supporting Actress winners